The following is a list of radio stations in the Canadian province of British Columbia, .
Radio stations are listed here by their legal city of licence. Some stations popularly associated with the Vancouver market may in fact be licensed to outlying communities such as New Westminster, Burnaby or North Vancouver. Those stations are listed under their legal city of licence.

See also 
 Lists of radio stations in North and Central America

External links
History of Radio stations in the Province of British Columbia - Canadian Communications Foundation

British Columbia
Radio stations